Charles Blount, 1st Earl of Devonshire, KG (pronounced Blunt; 15633 April 1606) was an English nobleman and soldier who served as Lord Deputy of Ireland under Queen Elizabeth I, and later as Lord Lieutenant of Ireland under King James I.

He succeeded to the family title as 8th Baron Mountjoy in 1594, before commanding the Crown's forces during the final years of Tyrone's Rebellion. He was able to defeat Tyrone at the Battle of Kinsale, and captured his headquarters at Dungannon before peace was agreed at the Treaty of Mellifont in 1603.

Early life
The second son of James, 6th Baron Mountjoy and Catherine, only daughter of Sir Thomas Leigh (Commissioner for Suppression of the Monasteries), Charles Blount was among the most distinguished of the family, succeeding as 8th Baron Mountjoy on the death of his unmarried elder brother William, 7th Baron Mountjoy. The good fortune of his youthful and handsome looks found favour with Queen Elizabeth I which aroused the jealousy of Robert Devereux, 2nd Earl of Essex, leading to a duel between the two courtiers, who later became close friends.

Charles Blount was returned to the Commons as MP for St Ives, Cornwall in 1584 and for Bere Alston in 1586 and 1593, before entering the House of Lords in 1594.

Between 1586 and 1598, Charles spent most of his time on the Continent, serving in the Netherlands and Brittany. He joined Lord Essex and Sir Walter Raleigh in their expedition to the Azores in 1597, along with his distant cousin, Sir Christopher Blount. (Sir Christopher had married Essex's mother, Lettice Knollys, Dowager Countess of Leicester, and he was afterwards executed for complicity in Essex's treason.)

Ireland 
The downfall of Lord Essex did no damage to Lord Mountjoy's career. After the failure of his rebellion, Essex shocked many by denouncing his sister Penelope, who was Mountjoy's mistress, as a traitor, which inevitably raised the question of his own possible involvement; but the Crown, anxious to retain Mountjoy's services, and also to show as much leniency as possible to the defeated rebels, simply ignored the accusation.

On 24 February 1600, Mountjoy landed in Ireland as Lord Deputy following Lord Essex and in the ensuing years brought the Nine Years' War to an end. The leader of the rebellion, Hugh O'Neill, Earl of Tyrone, wrote about Mountjoy's "refined manners" that he would lose a whole season of campaigning "while waiting until breakfast is prepared to his mind!". Despite this, Mountjoy proved that he was quite qualified to pursue the war.

In early 1600, Mountjoy had dispatched Sir Henry Docwra with an army of 4,200 troops to land at Culmore to erect a fortress commanding the shores of Lough Foyle in the north-west of Ulster. To prevent Hugh O'Neill from sending a strong force to repulse Dowcra's forces, Mountjoy advanced in force from Dublin to Newry causing O'Neill to fear a southern advance into Tyrone.

Mountjoy aimed to avoid the mistakes of previous Lords-Deputy. After the Battle of Moyry Pass, he had it cleared and a garrison established there. It had long been a problem for English forces advancing into Ulster from the south. He also established posts with garrisons at Mountnorris and Armagh.

On 13 July 1601, Mountjoy with his army along with Turlough MacHenry O'Neill of the Fews who had recently switched to the English side in the war, had a stand-off with Hugh O'Neill's forces at the River Blackwater. After a few shots in vain from either side, O'Neill's forces withdrew and Mountjoy sent his forces to occupy the ruined Blackwater fort destroyed by O'Neill in 1595. Later O'Neill's forces attacked Mountjoy's camp before withdrawing. In response, the Lord-Deputy sent his forces across the river where they found strong artificially fortified fords, which would have held out against the English.

By 15 July 1601, the Lord-Deputy had secured the surrender of O'Neill's ally Magennis. That month, Mountjoy had a new fort near the old Blackwater fort erected.

Mountjoy reported to the council in England that O'Neill was determined to prevent his forces from advancing into Tyrone and towards Dungannon. As such he initiated a policy of burning large quantities of corn to induce a famine to drive the rebels out of their strongholds.

Mountjoy set about trying to entice Hugh's forces to come out and attack by fetching some materials for the new fort from the Tyrone side of the river as well as burning more corn. Further skirmishes between Mountjoy and O'Neill's forces ensued during the summer of 1601.

Spanish forces had landed in Munster in August 1601, forcing Mountjoy to send his forces southwards leaving O'Neill remaining in his unbroken heartland of Tyrone. The Spanish arrival culminated in the Battle of Kinsale that December, which saw a major defeat of the rebels and their allies.

O'Neill during this time had also moved south to assist some of his allies, however, after some serious defeats at the hands of the forces of the Earl of Clanricarde of Connacht, he was in no place to offer any effective resistance once Mountjoy marched once more to Tyrone in the summer of 1602.

Mountjoy advanced to the location he found the previous summer at the River Blackwater, which commanded safe and secure passage into Tyrone, previously inaccessible, and set about erecting a new fort. O'Neill having observed this burnt his capital at Dungannon and fled to his last refuge in Glenconkeyne.

Advancing northwards through Tyrone, Mountjoy erected a fort in the townland of Magheralamfield, afterwards known as Mountjoy Castle. He also Christened the new fort at the Blackwater Charlemont Fort after himself.

Once in Tyrone, Mountjoy carried out a campaign of devastation throughout it resulting in the mass hunting of rebels, spoiling of corn, the burning of houses and the killing of churls so as to force the submission of O'Neill and his remaining allies. Most symbolically Mountjoy had the inauguration site of the O'Neill's at Tullyhogue Fort destroyed.

On 30 March 1603, six days after the death of Elizabeth and the accession of James I, O'Neill made peace with Mountjoy, signing the Treaty of Mellifont. Mountjoy continued in office with the more distinguished title of Lord-Lieutenant (1603–1604). He declared amnesty for the rebels and granted them honourable terms, which caused some severe criticism from England. He showed similar moderation in putting down the abortive risings in Cork,  Waterford and Wexford, where the aldermen, apparently with some vague idea of gaining greater toleration for Roman Catholics, refused to proclaim the new King: in Cork, three insurgents were hanged after a summary trial, but the rest were acquitted or pardoned.

As part of the Plantation of Ulster, the majority of the barony of Loughinsholin was detached from County Tyrone and made part of the newly created County Londonderry. The rest of Loughinsholin along with the northern parts of Dungannon barony were merged to create the short-lived barony of Mountjoy. It would later be amalgamated with the barony of Dungannon.

Later life
On his return to England, Lord Mountjoy served as one of Sir Walter Raleigh's judges in 1603, and in the same year King James I appointed him Master of the Ordnance as well as creating him Earl of Devonshire, granting him extensive estates. He was one of the founder members of the Spanish Company re-founded by royal charter in 1605.

Mountjoy's long-term successor in Ireland was Sir Arthur Chichester. Ireland remained in a state of some tension, with a number of disgruntled Gaelic Irish allies of the Crown angered by Mountjoy's generous terms to the Earls of Tyrone and Tyrconnell which meant land that had been promised to them had now been restored to the earls. 

In 1607, a year after Mountjoy's death, the flight of the Earls took place. The following year a former government ally Sir Cahir O'Doherty attacked and burned Derry, launching O'Doherty's Rebellion. The flight and the rebellion led to the Plantation of Ulster, something that had not been envisaged by Mountjoy when he had made peace in 1603.

Marriage

Towards the end of his life, on 26 December 1605 at Wanstead House near London, in a ceremony conducted by his chaplain William Laud, afterwards Archbishop of Canterbury, he married his long-time mistress Lady Penelope (died 7 July 1607), formerly wife of Robert, 3rd Baron Rich (later 1st Earl of Warwick) and sister of Robert Devereux, 2nd Earl of Essex. 

After the execution of her brother in 1601, Lord Rich divorced her in the ecclesiastical courts. The marriage was carried out in defiance of canon law and resulted in the disgrace of both parties, who were banished from King James I's court circles. The Earl and Countess of Devonshire continued to live together as husband and wife with their illegitimate children until his death a few months later in the following year.

Illegitimate progeny
His illegitimate children by his mistress Lady Rich, of whom he acknowledged the paternity, included:
Penelope Rich (1592–?) – despite her surname, she was a daughter of Penelope by Blount
Mountjoy Blount, 1st Earl of Newport (1597–1666)
Sir Saint John Blount – baptized at St Clement Danes with the name 'Scipio Rich', 8 December 1597. Saint John Blount, being described as the brother of Mountjoy, Lord Mountjoy, was made a Knight of the Bath on 1 February 1625 at the coronation of King Charles I, along with his nephew Robert Rich, son of his half brother the 2nd Earl of Warwick. His daughter Penelope (died probably before 1651) was the wife of Dr. Stephen Goffe.
Ruth Blount (1600–1694)
Isabella (Elizabeth) Blount
Charles Blount (1605–1627)

Legacy
Lord Devonshire left no legitimate children, and so his hereditary titles became extinct at his death on 3 April 1606 at Savoy House, London. His young contemporary, John Ford wrote one of his two earliest works, Fame's Memorial, as an elegy of 1169 lines on the recently deceased Charles Blount, 1st Earl of Devonshire. Ford has an acrostic – a series of lines whose first letters spell a word or name – in his prefatory dedication of the elegiac poem to Penelope Devereux, countess of Devonshire.

See also 
 Baron Mountjoy
 Blount baronets

Bibliography

Notes

References

 Berleth, Richard: The Twilight Lords, 1978; reissued 1994, Barnes & Noble Books, 

|-

1563 births
1606 deaths
Charles
Devonshire, Charles Blount, 1st Earl of
16th-century English nobility
17th-century English nobility
Knights of the Garter
Lords Lieutenant of Ireland
Lord-Lieutenants of Hampshire
Court of Elizabeth I
Blount, Charles
Blount, Charles
People of Elizabethan Ireland
Members of the Spanish Company
Members of the Parliament of England for Bere Alston
English MPs 1584–1585
English MPs 1586–1587
English MPs 1593
English people of the Anglo-Spanish War (1585–1604)
People of the Nine Years' War (Ireland)
Barons Mountjoy (1465)